Michael Alan Nelson (born June 6, 1971) is an American comic book writer and novelist.  He is best known for the comic book and novel series Hexed, Supergirl comics, and co-writing the "Day Men" comics series. Nelson has written over 30 graphic novels.

Nelson has co-written a variety of graphic novels with notable collaborators from "Malignant Man" with film director James Wan to "Insurrection 3.6" with screenwriter Blake Masters to actor Peter Facinelli on "Protocol Orphans" to "The Last Reign: Kings of War" with Wild Hogs director Walt Becker.

Nelson has worked with some of the top comic book artists in the industry. His series "Day Men" features artwork by the  illustrator Brian Stelfreeze. Illustrators such as Paul Pope (Hexed), Sean Phillips (28 Days Later), Tim Bradstreet (28 Days Later), and John Cassaday (Swordsmith Assassin) have generated covers for Nelson's series. Nelson's series also showcased artists that would go on to have high-profile careers such as Emma Rios (Pretty Deadly), Declan Shalvey, and Matteo Scalera (Black Science (comics)).

Nelson has written two series tapping world-famous classic pulp authors: his adaptation of Robert E. Howard's "Hawks of Outremer" and a modern spin on H.P. Lovecraft's Cthulhu Mythos in "Fall of Cthulhu".

Awards
 2004 New Times 55 Fiction contest for short-short "The Conspirators"
 2011 Glyph Award: "Best Female Character": Selena from the series "28 Days Later (comics)".
 2014 nomination "The Ghastly Awards" for "Best Archival Collection" for 28 Days Later (comics).

Film adaptations
 October 22, 2012 The Hollywood Reporter announced that Paramount Pictures had picked up "Insurrection 3.6" for development as a feature film with Michael De Luca and Matt Tolmach producing.
 August 19, 2013 Deadline.com disclosed that Universal Pictures had acquired the rights to Day Men as a movie in "a pre-emptive seven-figure bid."
 On June 17, 2014 Deadline.com reported that Fox has picked up Malignant Man for film development with James Wan attached to direct. In August 2017, Rebecca Thomas was hired to direct the movie.
 On August 19, 2015 Deadline.com reported that Fox TV picked up "Protocol: Orphans" for development.

Novel
 October 21, 2014 Pyr (publisher) announced the publication of a YA novel based on Nelson's comic book series Hexed: Hexed: Sisters of Witchdown. The Mary Sue website excerpted Chapter 2 of the novel on April 28 and Pyr released the novel on May 5, 2015.

Short comics stories
Cthulhu Tales short story "The Beach" (with Andrew Ritchie), BOOM! Studios, July 2006.
Cthulhu Tales: The Rising short story "For You" (with Andrew Ritchie), BOOM! Studios, February 2007.
Cthulhu Tales (ongoing series) #1 short story "The Farm" (with Sunder Raj), BOOM! Studios, March 2008.
Cthulhu Tales (ongoing series) #5 short story "The Doorman" (with Milton Sobreiro), BOOM! Studios, July 2008.
Fear the Dead one shot (with various artists), BOOM! Studios, April 2006.
Ninja Tales short story, BOOM! Studios, January 2007.
Pirate Tales short story, BOOM! Studios, April 2006.
Zombie Tales short story "Severance" (with Joe Abraham), BOOM! Studios, June 2005.
Zombie Tales: Oblivion short story "Riot Grrrl" (with Andy Kuhn), BOOM! Studios, October 2005.
Zombie Tales: The Dead short story "The Miracle of Bethany" (with Lee Moder), BOOM! Studios, April 2006.

Individual comic book issues
Action Comics 23.1: Cyborg Superman one shot (with Mike Hawthorne), DC Comics, September 4, 2013.

Collected editions

References

External links

Print interviews
 October 29, 2008 on Comics Bulletin
 May 2, 2011 on Bloody Disgusting
. February 22, 2013 on Comic Vine
 February 26, 2013 on Newsarama
. (September 11, 2013 on Nerdist)
. June 20, 2014 Comic Book Resources

Video interviews
 April 5, 2011 on Things From Another World
 June 1, 2012 on Mask & Cape
 November 6, 2012 on Comics Continuum
 May 1, 2014 on Pop Culture Network
. August 1, 2014 at San Diego Comic-Con International on Comic Wow!
 September 16, 2014 at Baltimore Comic Con on Comic Wow!

Audio interviews
 Major Spoilers

Living people
1971 births
Cthulhu Mythos writers